Best Bones Forever! is a national bone health campaign that encourages girls ages 9–14 to adopt healthy habits for bone growth and osteoporosis prevention. The campaign was created by the U.S. Department of Health and Human Services’ Office on Women’s Health (OWH) in 2009. The campaign uses popular language, bright colors and images, and energetic messages to express a focus on fun and friendship. Best Bones Forever! aims to improve girls’ bone health behaviors, which include eating foods with calcium and vitamin D and participating in regular physical activity.

In 2014, OWH concluded its work on the Best Bones Forever! campaign and transferred leadership to American Bone Health, a nonprofit organization that had been a longtime partner of the campaign.

Bone Health
By the end of high school, girls develop up to 90% of their bone mass. Therefore, it is critical that girls ages 9 to 18 build strong, healthy bones that will remain strong for life. Foods high in calcium and vitamin D and 60 minutes of daily bone-strengthening activity will help lower girls’ risk of developing fractures or osteoporosis later in life.

Bone Healthy Foods 
 Calcium: Girls ages 9 to 18 need 1,300 milligrams (mg) of calcium every day. One serving of low-fat or fat-free milk (1 cup) has about 300 mg. Other foods with calcium include calcium-fortified orange juice (500 mg), low-fat or fat-free yogurt (up to 450 mg), cheese, fortified cereals, broccoli, and almonds.
 Vitamin D: In addition to calcium, adolescents need 600 international units (IU) of vitamin D a day. The body needs vitamin D in order to absorb calcium.
 Check labels:  Reading the Nutrition Facts Panel (otherwise known as the food label) on a package can reveal how healthy or unhealthy a food item is.
 Adding Up the Calcium: Nutrition Facts labels don't show how many milligrams of calcium are in a food item. Instead, they show the amount of calcium in a food as a percentage of the Daily Value (written as %Daily Value or %DV). To figure out milligrams on a food label, look at % Daily Value for calcium, and then add 0 to the end of that number. For example, girls need 130% DV for calcium every day. 130% Daily Value is the same amount as 1,300 milligrams of calcium. Note: This calculation works only for calcium, not for other nutrients on the food label.
 Calcium Calculator: The Best Bones Forever! website offers a calcium calculator to help girls understand and increase their daily calcium intake.

Physical Activity 
Girls between the ages of 9 and 18 need 60 minutes of physical activity a day, including bone-strengthening activities at least three times a week such as running, jumping, hiking, playing soccer, and dancing.

Activity levels decrease as girls enter their teenage years. Encouraging girls to adopt physical activity as a lifelong habit or lifestyle may help them remain active throughout life.

Campaign Highlights
 The Let's Dance Contest: In 2011, to encourage girls to get active, Best Bones Forever! teamed up with teen recording pop group Savvy to launch a national dance contest for girls between the ages of 9 and 18. To enter, girls were required to choreograph a 70-second dance to one of Savvy's songs and upload it to the contest website. Submissions were judged based on creativity, how well they represented Best Bones Forever!, how well they moved all the bones in their bodies, and for how well they worked as a team. Weekly prizes were awarded, and the grand prize was a trip to Los Angeles to appear in a Savvy music video.

 Best Bones Forever! went to the White House: In 2011, the Best Bones Forever! team taught First Lady Michelle Obama how to do “the BBF,” a dance choreographed by Best Bones Forever!. Representatives from Hager Sharp and OWH led a dance demonstration on the South Lawn of the White House. The President’s Council on Fitness, Sports & Nutrition event was hosted by the First Lady to announce three new Let’s Move! initiatives to promote physical fitness among military families. Best Bones Forever! led the First Lady, Olympic Gymnast Dominique Dawes, fitness expert Donna Richardson Joyner, and event participants in a line dance that got their heart rates up and their bones moving. Event participants went home with free bone-health materials that included campaign journals, magnets, and playing cards.
 Atlanta Dance Contest & Weekend Jam: The Best Bones Forever! Weekend Jam was a weekend-long event for girls in 2010 in Atlanta, Georgia. The event began with a dance competition featuring finalists from the Best Bones Forever! Atlanta Dance Contest, performances by Atlanta-based hip hop group Swagger Crew, and appearances from members of the Atlanta Dream Shooting Stars and Olympic gold medalist Allyson Felix. The winning team was dubbed Best Dancers Ever! and went home with prizes such as Wiis and Just Dance 2 games.

Partners

Campaign partners help Best Bones Forever! bring campaign messages and free materials directly to girls and the adults around them such as parents, health care providers, coaches, teachers, etc. Partners developed Best Bones Forever! products such as t-shirts and charm necklaces for purchase, letting girls become brand carriers and feel campaign ownership. Partners have also placed campaign PSAs in their magazines, event programs, newsletters, and they invite Best Bones Forever! to attend their events.

Best Bones Forever! has more than 60 partners, including: National Osteoporosis Foundation, Girl Scouts of the USA, Girls Inc., AllyKatzz.com, Pink Locker Society, Savvy, President's Council on Fitness, Sports & Nutrition, American Alliance for Health, Physical Education, Recreation and Dance, National Association of School Nurses, Women's Sports Foundation.

Skelegirls
The Best Bones Forever! traveling display, Skelegirls, allows girls to pose as the faces of the campaign's signature Skelegirls’ bodies. The photos become a souvenir for girls to share with friends, helping to spread awareness of the campaign and its goals.

Best Bones Forever! Ambassadors
Best Bones Forever! Ambassadors serve as spokespersons for the campaign and role models for girls.
Julie Zetlin Julie Zetlin, a rhythmic gymnast, is the 2010 U.S. National Champion and the 2010 Pan American Champion. Her performance at the 2010 Rhythmic World Championships made Julie the first American-born gymnast to qualify for the rhythmic all-around finals at the World Championships. She hopes to earn a spot on the 2012 Olympic team.
Elizabeth Hawthorne Elizabeth Anne Hawthorne was the third runner up in the Miss Michigan 2011 pageant with Best Bones Forever! as her platform, and the winner of the Miss America Community Service Award. She has also held the titles Miss Oakland County 2010 and Miss Teen Michigan 2008. In 2011, Elizabeth advocated for Michigan Osteoporosis Day, which aims to raise awareness about the importance of bone health on October 20, 2011. Elizabeth is also a National Osteoporosis Foundation spokesperson. 
Larysa DiDio Larysa DiDio, celebrity personal trainer and fitness author, has over 20 years of experience in helping celebrities, pro athletes, moms, dads, and kids attain their health and fitness goals. Author of Sneaky Fitness: Fun Foolproof Ways To Slip Fitness Into Your Child's Everyday Life, Larysa has created a handbook that provides busy parents with games and activities to encourage their kids to exercise.

Media Presence
 Teen Vogue
 AllyKatzz
 Pink Locker Society
 BOP and Tiger Beat
 PBS Kids - It's My Life
 Sports Girls Play
 Kidzworld

See also
Bone density
Osteoporosis

References

External links
Official website
Official website for Parents
NIAMS: Juvenile Bone Health
American Bone Health

Health education in the United States
Health campaigns